Lora Miana, or Lwara Myana is an area of Mula Gori Tehsil, Khyber Agency, Federally Administered Tribal Areas, Pakistan. The population is 7,466 according to the 2017 census.

References 

Populated places in Khyber District